Sidewinder is the name of three different fictional characters appearing in American comic books published by Marvel Comics. The original Sidewinder, Seth Voelker, first appeared in Marvel Two-in-One #64 (Jun 1980), created by writers Mark Gruenwald and Ralph Macchio. A second Sidewinder appeared in 1998 but was killed during his attempt to infiltrate S.H.I.E.L.D. A third Sidewinder, Gregory Bryan, was given powers similar to the original Sidewinder by the Brand Corporation

Seth Voelker started out as an Economics professor before Roxxon Oil Company chemically mutated him and gave him the power to teleport, starting his criminal career as Sidewinder. He initially worked as hired henchman alongside Anaconda, Death Adder and Black Mamba. Later he organized the Serpent Society a group of snake-themed criminals for hire, with the Society working like a trade union. At one point Sidewinder was deposed as leader by Viper as several members of the Society had infiltrated the group to help Viper from within. While Viper was defeated, Sidewinder chose to leave the Society with King Cobra taking control of the Serpent Society. He later retires from being a criminal.

The third Sidewinder, Gregory Bryan, was given his powers by the Brand Corporation and became a member of the Serpent Society later on. He later became a member of Serpent Solutions when the Society was reorganized.

Publication history

The original Sidewinder, Seth Voelker, first appeared in Marvel Two-in-One #64 (Jun 1980), created by writers Mark Gruenwald and Ralph Macchio.

Fictional character biography

Seth Voelker
Seth Voelker was born in Kenosha, Wisconsin and grew up to become an economics professor. He failed to make tenure and was hired by the Roxxon Oil Company as an economic analyst. He discovered their criminal schemes and they permitted him to apply for mutagenic alteration. As the professional criminal Sidewinder, he was originally hired by Roxxon to retrieve the Serpent Crown. Alongside the third incarnation of the Serpent Squad, Sidewinder was able to return the crown to company president Hugh Jones, after a battle with the Thing, Stingray, Triton, and the Scarlet Witch.  However, after his stint working for Roxxon, he decided to form his own criminal organization, the Serpent Society. He organized the Serpent Society, conducted initiation tests, and contacted potential clients. In the Society's first mission, Sidewinder dispatched them to kill MODOK on behalf of AIM.  With the ability to teleport, Sidewinder promised his recruits they would never be imprisoned.  This attracted several snake-themed villains, and the Serpent Society was quite successful, much to Captain America's frustration.  He also had a romantic relationship with Black Mamba.

In the Serpent Society's next mission, Sidewinder dispatched them against Captain America, and Sidewinder freed them from prison after their capture. He dispatched the Society to hunt down the Scourge who had murdered Death Adder. Sidewinder later rescued Black Racer, Copperhead, Fer-de-Lance, and Puff Adder from jail, and enlisted them in the Serpent Society.

Sidewinder was betrayed by his organization after Viper infiltrated the group. After being poisoned, he was aided by Diamondback and the two survived. He then freed Diamondback and Nomad from Commission custody. With Diamondback, he stole an artifact from Mister Jip on behalf of clients Ghaur and Llyra. He rescued Diamondback from execution by the Serpent Society. He helped Black Mamba and the Asp escape King Cobra's grasp, and fled King Cobra's reprisals.  Sidewinder later unsuccessfully attempted to make peace with King Cobra by freeing him from the Vault.

Sidewinder retired from villainy in order to allow Captain America to help him get money for his daughter who was ill with cancer.

Some time later, Sidewinder was seen in an interview after his retirement from villainy.

Infiltrator
A new Sidewinder was hired by Death-Sting and Sharyd to infiltrate a S.H.I.E.L.D. station and retrieve the Zodiac Key, as an early test mission. Sidewinder made it past the neural shock unit, defeated the S.H.I.E.L.D. guards and marveled at the Key's power. He teleported past the electro-shield only to be savagely electrocuted, leaving only his skeleton behind.

Gregory Bryan
Gregory Bryan had been turned into the new Sidewinder by the Brand Corporation under the orders of Hugh Jones and was a member of the Serpent Society. After Gregory left, Cobra used the Brand Corporation's equipment (which had been long stolen by the Serpent Society) to create more Sidewinders.

Upon being improved, Sidewinder later sprung the other Serpent Society members from their cells. After the group had captured and chained Captain America and Diamondback (who was really an L.M.D.) in this underground New York headquarters, the pair escaped. Sidewinder was knocked out by "Diamondback". S.H.I.E.L.D. subsequently took Sidewinder and the rest of the Society into custody.

During the Secret Invasion storyline, Sidewinder re-joined the Serpent Society. The Society held a number of civilians hostage in a compound in the American Midwest claiming they were protecting themselves from the Skrulls. However, they were easily defeated by Nova and his new Nova Corps.

As part of the All-New, All-Different Marvel event, Sidewinder appears as a member of Viper's Serpent Society under its new name of Serpent Solutions.

During the "Opening Salvo" part of the Secret Empire storyline, Sidewinder was with Serpent Solutions at the time when they are recruited by Baron Helmut Zemo to join his Army of Evil.

Powers and abilities
Sidewinder possesses a cloak, created by scientists at the Roxxon subsidiary Brand Corporation's mutagenics laboratory and based on Nth Projector technology, which contains electronic circuitry that enables the wearer to open an aperture into another dimension. Sidewinder activates the cloak mentally through a device implanted in his body, enabling him to travel "sideways" through interdimensional space, taking with him whatever and whomever he drapes his cloak over. A cybernetic control chip implanted in Sidewinder's brain allows him to control it with pinpoint accuracy, and activate pre-programmed coordinates if he is knocked out or badly wounded. He has taken the precaution of implanting locator chips in his allies, allowing him to teleport to their location. Sidewinder can teleport anything that his cape can cover, up to the approximate size and shape of another human being. Sidewinder's armor provides protection against small-arms fire and a rebreather unit allowing him to survive underwater for extended periods. He also has the ability to emit energy tendrils, which he calls his "Side Effects," from his forehead. It is not clear if this is a natural ability or a function of his armor. Seth Voelker possesses no actual superhuman powers. He is a skilled financial expert, business planner, and strategist. He has an advanced degree in economics.

Other versions

Ultimate Marvel
In the Ultimate universe, Sidewinder is a member of the gang called the Serpent Skulls. He serves as a lieutenant, and close friend to Diamondback. He wears a chauffeur-like outfit, and employs several other gang members in similar attire. Similar to his main counterpart, Sidewinder has the ability to teleport.

References

External links
 Sidewinder (Seth Voelker) at Marvel.com
 
 
 

Characters created by Mark Gruenwald
Characters created by Ralph Macchio
Comics characters introduced in 1980
Fictional characters from Wisconsin
Marvel Comics characters who can teleport
Marvel Comics mutates
Marvel Comics supervillains